Burn It! is the third studio album by English band Modern Romance. It was released in 1985 on LP and Cassette tape by RCA and has not since been reissued. Although the record sleeve states the LP was released in 1985, the label on the actual LP is dated 1984. Furthermore, the label states the LP title as Move On.

Track listing
"Burn It!" (David Jaymes, Michael John Mullins, Luís Jardim, Andy Kyriacou) - 6:42
"That's What Friends Are For" (David Jaymes, Michael John Mullins) - 3:35
"Keep a Candle Burning" (David Jaymes, Michael John Mullins, Alexander James Legg) - 3:34
"That's Entertainment" (David Jaymes, Michael John Mullins) - 4:07
"I'll Always Remember You" (David Jaymes, Michael John Mullins) - 3:48
"Move On" (David Jaymes, Michael John Mullins, Tony Visconti) - 3:36
"Wasting Away" (Robbie Jaymes, Michael John Mullins, David Jaymes) - 3:41
"(Blame My) Jealousy" (Andy Kyriacou) - 3:51
"Take Another Look" (David Jaymes, Michael John Mullins, Luís Jardim) - 5:00
"Burn It! (Reprise)" (David Jaymes, Michael John Mullins, Luís Jardim, Andy Kyriacou) - 0:53

An expanded digital edition containing alternate mixes and B-sides was released in 2011.

Personnel
Modern Romance
Michael J. Mullins - vocals
Paul Gendler - guitar
David Jaymes - bass guitar
Robbie Jaymes - synthesizer
Andy Kyriacou - drums
Luís Jardim - percussion [Credited on Sleeve]
Technical
Bryan Evans - engineer
Steve Rapport - photography

Singles
"Move On" (1984)
"That's What Friends Are For" (1984)
"Burn It! (1985)

External links
IMDB - Internet Movie Database - https://www.imdb.com/name/nm2167905/J
John Du Prez - IMDB - https://www.imdb.com/name/nm0006047/
David Jaymes - IMDB - https://www.imdb.com/name/nm1659850/
Paul Gendler - IMDB - https://www.imdb.com/name/nm0312678/
Modern Romance (band) - Discogs Website - http://www.discogs.com/artist/Modern+Romance

Notes and references

1985 albums
Modern Romance (band) albums
Albums produced by Tony Visconti
RCA Records albums